A by-election was held on 4 July 2020 for the seat of Chini in the Pahang State Legislative Assembly. The seat became vacant following the death of the incumbent Member of the Legislative Assembly (MLA) from United Malays National Organisation (UMNO) of Barisan Nasional (BN) coalition, Abu Bakar Harun on 7 May 2020 who had held the seat since 2004. Mohd Sharim Md Zain from BN won the by-election with a 12,650 majority to retain the seat again.

The Election Commission (EC) had set the nomination day on 20 June 2020, early voting on 30 June and polling day for 4 July with a 14-day campaign period.

Chini, one of the four state constituencies within the Pekan federal constituency which is currently held by BN's adviser and former Prime Minister Najib Razak, is a majority Malay seat with 91% Malays. There are 20,990 registered voters for the Chini by-election comprising 20,972 ordinary voters and 18 early voters. The voters comprise 10,269 men and 10,721 women. This will be the first election in the country following the 2020 political crisis and COVID-19 pandemic. The by-election to be conducted under the special standard operating procedure (SOP) imposed by EC due to the New Normal as the country is still observing the recovery phase of Movement Control Order (MCO) for COVID-19.

Nominations
Secretary-General of UMNO and BN, Annuar Musa confirmed that BN will place its candidate in the by-election and continue to work with Pan-Malaysian Islamic Party (PAS) on the concept of Muafakat Nasional (MN) as in the previous by-elections. UMNO also confirmed it will represent BN to defend the seat. Najib Razak's eldest son, Mohd Nizar Najib who is the Pekan UMNO Youth chief has been coined as a potential party candidate of the by-election. On 18 June, Barisan Nasional decided to nominate Mohd Sharim Md Zain, a FELDA resident as its candidate for the by-election.

Malaysian United Indigenous Party (BERSATU) had also declared its full support to the  chosen BN candidate who will be representing the new Perikatan Nasional (PN) government. Pekan BERSATU deputy chief, Tengku Zainul Hisham Tengku Hussin, however announced his candidacy for the by-election as an Independent candidate on 18 June.

People's Justice Party (PKR) Secretary-general, Saifuddin Nasution Ismail announced that Pakatan Harapan (PH) will not contest the by-election. Saifuddin cited that the COVID-19 pandemic may affect the safety of voters, therefore abandoning the race. Conceding the coalition's presidential council decision, PH might back independent candidate instead at the polls in order to fight against UMNO and BN.

On Nomination Day, the BN candidate Mohd Sharim, alongside two independents; later-got-sacked BERSATU's Tengku Zainul (house logo) and social activist Mohd Shukri Mohd Ramli (key logo), filed their nomination papers for a three-way race for the state assembly seat.

Result

Results based on polling district
BN won all polling districts and post and early votes.

Previous result

References

2020 elections in Malaysia
By-elections in Malaysia
Elections in Pahang
July 2020 events in Malaysia